Prime Ticket may refer to:

 Bally Sports West, a regional sports network that was known as Prime Ticket from 1985 to 1995
 Bally Sports SoCal, a regional sports network that was known as Prime Ticket from 2006 to 2021

Former subsidiaries of The Walt Disney Company